The Saint Lawrence Bay (Zaliv Lavrentiya) is a bay in the Bering Sea on the eastern coast of the Chukotka Peninsula, Russian Federation.

Geography
This bay is located very close to the Bering Strait, which lies only a few km to the NE.

The bay is open towards the southeast; it is 45 km in length and has an average width of about 8 km. There are two little islands inside the bay where it narrows forming an inlet. On the southern shore of the bay at Cape Hargilah is the village of Port Lawrence.

History
British Captain James Cook landed for a few hours in St. Lawrence Bay and met some of the local Chukchi people in August 1778, but he didn't linger in the bay.

This bay was first surveyed by Russian mariner Count Fyodor Petrovich Litke in 1828.

See also
Lavrentiya
USS Rodgers (1879)

References

All locations
Dwarf plants in St. Lawrence Bay

Bays of Chukotka Autonomous Okrug
Bays of the Bering Sea